Monoculus is a genus of succulent plants in the pot marigold tribe within the sunflower family, split from the genus Osteospermum by Bertil Nordenstam in 2006.

The two recognised species occur in the Western Cape of South Africa, with one species (M. monstrosus) extending into Namibia.

References

Calenduleae
Asteraceae genera
Flora of Southern Africa